Layla Fourie is a 2013 thriller film directed by Pia Marais. It is a co-production between Germany, South Africa, France and the Netherlands. It premiered in competition at the 63rd Berlin International Film Festival where Marais won a Special Mention.

Cast
 Rayna Campbell as Layla Fourie
 August Diehl as Eugene Pienaar
 Jeroen Kranenburg
 Rapulana Seiphemo as Sipho Khumalo
 Jeanne Balibar
 Yûho Yamashita as Suzy
 Gérard Rudolf as Van Niekerk

References

External links
 

2013 films
2013 thriller films
2010s English-language films
German thriller films
French thriller films
Dutch thriller films
English-language South African films
English-language German films
English-language French films
English-language Dutch films
South African thriller films
2010s German films
2010s French films